Jane Griffiths (born 1970) is a British poet and literary historian.

Career and writings
Griffiths was born in Exeter, England, and brought up in the Netherlands. She studied English at Oxford University, where she won the Newdigate prize for her poem "The House". After working as a bookbinder in London and Norfolk, she returned to Oxford to gain a doctorate with a dissertation on the Tudor poet John Skelton, and became an editor on the Oxford English Dictionary. Her poetry gained her an Eric Gregory Award in 1996.

Griffiths taught at Oxford University's St. Edmund Hall, before becoming a lecturer in English literature at the University of Edinburgh. She was appointed a lecturer in the Department of English at the University of Bristol in 2007. In 2012, she left her position as senior lecturer in English literature at the University of Bristol to become a CUF Lecturer in medieval and early modern English literature at the University of Oxford and a tutorial fellow of Wadham College. According to her university page, Griffiths works primarily on the poetry and drama of the fifteenth and early sixteenth centuries.  Her first monograph on John Skelton was published by Oxford University Press (OUP) in 2005, and she is working on a second monograph, on marginal glosses, which is also to be published by OUP.

Her collection Another Country was short-listed for the 2008 Forward Poetry Prize.
Griffiths' fourth collection of poetry Terrestrial Variations was published by Bloodaxe Books in 2012. It was described by Adam Thorpe (The Guardian) as "sensuously wrought and even, at times, subtly erotic, her poems simultaneously evoke another level of pure abstraction, with words in place of coils of paint". In 2017 Griffiths’ fifth collection of poems Silent In Finisterre was published. It was described by Sarah Broom in The Times Literary Supplement as "a major achievement, outstanding, complex and subtle in thought, supple of tone and piercing in its observation".

Her collection Little Silver was published by Bloodaxe Books in 2022.

Poetry volumes
The House (Hitchin: Mandeville Press, 1990). 
A Grip on Thin Air (Tarset, Northumberland: Bloodaxe Books, 2000). 
Icarus on Earth (Tarset, Northumberland: Bloodaxe Books, 2005). 
Another Country: New and Selected Poems (Tarset, Northumberland: Bloodaxe Books, 2008). .
Terrestrial Variations (Tarset, Northumberland: Bloodaxe Books, 2012) .  
Silent In Finisterre (Tarset, Northumberland: Bloodaxe Books, 2017) .
Little Silver (Tarset, Northumberland: Bloodaxe Books, 2022) .

References

1970 births
Living people
English women poets
21st-century English poets
21st-century English women